The Huon Gulf languages are Western Oceanic languages spoken primarily in Morobe Province of Papua New Guinea. They may form a group of the North New Guinea languages, perhaps within the Ngero–Vitiaz branch of that family.

Unusually for Oceanic languages, two North Huon Gulf languages, Bukawa and Yabem, are tonal. The only other tonal Oceanic languages are found in New Caledonia.

Classification
According to Lynch, Ross, & Crowley (2002), the structure of the family is as follows:

North Huon Gulf linkage
Markham family
South Huon Gulf linkage
Numbami

Proto-Huon Gulf

Proto-Huon Gulf was reconstructed by Malcolm Ross in 1986 in Proto-Oceanic and the Austronesian Languages of Western Melanesia. It is reconstructed on the basis of shared phonological, morphosyntactic and lexicosemantic innovations relative to Proto-Oceanic, such as the pervasive lenition of Proto-Oceanic *p to *v, the acquisition of a final *-c in some words, the idiosyncratic change of Proto-Oceanic  'pig' to Proto-Huon Gulf , and the loss of all verb-deriving prefixes such as  'causative',  'reciprocal',  'stative', and  'intransitive'.

Vowels
The vowels of Proto-Huon Gulf, according to Ross, are:

Consonants
The consonants of Proto-Huon Gulf, according to Ross, are:
 {| class="wikitable" style="text-align:center"
|+Consonants
! colspan="2" |
!Labiovelar
!Bilabial
!Alveolar
!Palatal
!Velar
!Uvular
|-
! rowspan="2" |Stop
!voiced
|
|*
|*
|*
|*
|
|-
!voiceless
|
|*
|*
|*
|*
|
|-
! colspan="2" |Nasal
|*
|*
|*
|*
|*
|
|-
! colspan="2" |Fricative
|*
|
|*
|
|*
|
|-
! colspan="2" |Approximant
|*
|
|*, *
|*
|
|*
|}

References

Ross, Malcolm (1988). Proto Oceanic and the Austronesian languages of western Melanesia. Canberra: Pacific Linguistics.

 
North New Guinea languages
Languages of Morobe Province